Konstantinos "Kostas" Charalampidis (alternate spellings: Constantinos, Costas, Haralampidis, Haralambidis, Haralabidis, Charalambides) (Greek: Κωνσταντίνος "Κώστας" Χαραλαμπίδης; born April 4, 1976) is a retired Greek professional basketball player who currently serves as an assistant coach for Peristeri of the Greek Basket League and the Basketball Champions League, under head coach Vassilis Spanoulis. During his playing career, he was a 6 ft 2  in (1.89 m) tall point guard-shooting guard.

Playing career

Club career
Charalampidis began his career playing with the Makedonikos Greece youth teams. He began his professional career with Makedonikos during the 1997–98 season, and he stayed there through the 2001–02 season. In 2002, he joined Olympia Larissa.

In 2004, he returned to Makedonikos. As a member of Makedonikos, he won the Greek Second Division championship twice, in the years 2000 and 2002. He was named the MVP of the Greek Second Division in 2002. He also played in the EuroCup Final with Makedonikos in 2005.

In 2006, he joined Maroussi. In 2009, he moved to Panellinios, where he was named to the All-EuroCup Second Team for the 2009–10 season. In 2010, he joined Aris Thessaloniki.

He joined KAOD in 2011, and he moved to the Italian Second Division club Brindisi in 2012. He then joined the Greek club PAOK for the 2012–13 season. He extended his contract with PAOK in 2014.

He officially announced his retirement from his basketball playing career in 2016, due to a serious knee injury. However, this was after he had not played in any games since November 2014.

Greek national team
Charalampidis played with Greece's junior national team at the 1999 World University Games. He was also a member of the senior men's Greek national basketball team.

Coaching career
After he retired from playing professional club basketball, Charalampidis began a career as a basketball coach. He became an assistant coach with the Greek club PAOK in 2016, working under the club's head coach, Soulis Markopoulos. In 2019, he became PAOK's head coach.
In the summer of 2020, Charalampidis became an assistant coach at Panathinaikos under head coach Georgios Vovoras.

Awards and accomplishments

As a player 
3× Greek League All-Star: (2009, 2010, 2013)
2× Greek Second Division Champion: (2000, 2002)
All-EuroCup Second Team: (2010)
Greek Second Division MVP: (2002)

References

External links
EuroCup Profile
FIBA Europe Profile
Eurobasket.com Profile
Greek Basket League Profile 
Greek Basket League Profile 
Draftexpress.com Profile
Kostas Charalampidis Interview 
Kostas Charalampidis Interview 

1976 births
Living people
Aris B.C. players
Greek basketball coaches
Greek Basket League players
Greek men's basketball players
K.A.O.D. B.C. players
Makedonikos B.C. players
Maroussi B.C. players
New Basket Brindisi players
Olympia Larissa B.C. players
Panathinaikos B.C. coaches
Panellinios B.C. players
P.A.O.K. BC coaches
P.A.O.K. BC players
Point guards
Shooting guards
Basketball players from Thessaloniki